The 2020 Speedway European Championship season was the eighth season of the Speedway European Championship (SEC) era, and the 20th UEM Individual Speedway European Championship. It was the seventh series under the promotion of One Sport Lts. of Poland.

Every round of the 2020 championship took place in Poland due to the global coronavirus pandemic. For the first time the winner of the series earned a spot in the 2021 Speedway Grand Prix series.

The title was won by Robert Lambert, who beat Leon Madsen by three points. The pair won all five rounds between them, with Madsen winning the first three before Lambert won the last two. Grigory Laguta took third place overall, while defending champion Mikkel Michelsen claimed fourth.

Qualification 
For the 2020 season, 15 permanent riders were joined at each SEC Final by one wildcard and two track reserves.

Defending champion, Mikkel Michelsen from Denmark was automatically invited to participate in all final events, while Grigory Laguta, Leon Madsen, Kacper Woryna and Bartosz Smektała secured their participation in all final events thanks to being in the top five of the general classification in the 2019 season. Due to the cancellation of the SEC Challenge, the rest of the line-up was completed by nominations from each of the national federations.

Qualified riders

Calendar

Championship Series 
All five events in the final series took place in Poland due to the coronavirus pandemic.

Final Classification

See also 
 2020 Speedway Grand Prix

References

External links 

2020
European Championship
Speedway European Championship
Speedway European Championship
Speedway European Championship